John Calvin Maxwell (born February 20, 1947) is an American author, speaker, and pastor who has written many books, primarily focusing on leadership. Titles include The 21 Irrefutable Laws of Leadership and The 21 Indispensable Qualities of a Leader. His books have sold millions of copies, with some on the New York Times Best Seller List.

Personal life 
Maxwell was born in Garden City, Michigan in 1947.  An evangelical Christian, he followed his father into the ministry. He completed a bachelor's degree at Circleville Bible College in 1969, a Master of Divinity degree at Azusa Pacific University, and a Doctor of Ministry degree at Fuller Theological Seminary. He currently resides in South Florida with his wife, Margaret. He is an ordained minister in the Wesleyan Church.

Career 

Since the 1970s, Maxwell has led churches in Indiana, Ohio, California, and Florida. After serving as a senior pastor for 14 years, he left Skyline Church in 1995. In 2004 Maxwell returned to congregational ministry at Christ Fellowship in Palm Beach Gardens, Florida, where he is currently a teaching pastor. On November 16, 2008, he began serving as a guest pastor at Crystal Cathedral in Orange County, California. His mentor, Robert H. Schuller, had a variety of noted evangelical pastors preach at his megachurch after his son, Robert A. Schuller, resigned as senior pastor in 2008. Maxwell returned to preach at the Crystal Cathedral several times and his messages were shown on the Hour of Power television program.

Maxwell is a leadership expert, speaker, and author. He founded INJOY, Maximum Impact, The John Maxwell Team, ISS and EQUIP. EQUIP is an international leadership development organization working to help leaders, involved with leaders from more than 80 nations. Its mission is "to see effective Christian leaders fulfill the Great Commission in every nation".

Maxwell speaks annually to Fortune 500 companies, international government leaders, and organizations as diverse as the United States Military Academy at West Point and the National Football League. A New York Times, Wall Street Journal, and Business Week best-selling author, he was one of 25 authors named to Amazon.com's 10th Anniversary Hall of Fame. Three of his books, The 21 Irrefutable Laws of Leadership, Developing the Leader Within You, and 21 Indispensable Qualities of a Leader, have each sold over a million copies.

In 2007, Maxwell was inducted into Omicron Delta Kappa at Concordia University Irvine. Maxwell has a building named after him and his family at Indiana Wesleyan University, the Maxwell Center for Business and Leadership, as a result of his influence on the Wesleyan Church, the owner of the university. In 2015, he was inducted into the IWU Society of World Changers, where he was awarded an honorary doctorate degree.

Maxwell was a keynote speaker at National Agents Alliance NAA Leadership Conference several times, most recently in 2010.  Maxwell was the keynote speaker for the Symmetry Financial Group's National Conference in February 2018. In 2012, he was awarded the Golden Gavel by Toastmasters International.

In May 2014, Maxwell was named the No. 1 leadership and management expert in the world by Inc. Magazine.

Leadership training in Guatemala
In July 2013, Maxwell's organization trained 24,000 leaders in Guatemala. Several John Maxwell Team members took part in the week-long leadership training sessions. In March 2022, Maxwell visited a Christian conference called Conference for Life and the Family in Guatemala City, supported by Guatemala's president, Alejandro Giammattei. During a meeting with employers, he praised Guatemalan Attorney General, Maria Consuelo Porras, calling her "a rockstar" and a "leader of leaders". Both Giammattei and Porras have been allegedly involved in corruption and persecution of both political opponents and anti-corruption officers.

Selected bibliography 
See List of books by John C. Maxwell for a more complete list
 There's No Such Thing as Business Ethics (There's Only ONE RULE for Making Decisions), Warner Business Books 2003
 The 15 Invaluable Laws of Growth, Center Street – 2012
 The 5 Levels of Leadership, Center Street – 2011
 Everyone Communicates, Few Connect: What the Most Effective People Do Differently, Thomas Nelson –2010
 Put Your Dream to the Test, Thomas Nelson – March 2009
 Leadership Gold: Lessons I've Learned from a Lifetime of Leading, Thomas Nelson – March 2008
 The 360° Leader, Thomas Nelson, January 2006 – One of Executive Book Summaries 30 Best Business Books in 2003
 Winning With People, Thomas Nelson, December 2004 – One of Executive Book Summaries 30 Best Business Books in 2005
 25 Ways to win with People companion to Winning with People
 Today Matters, Warner Books, April 2004
 Thinking For a Change, Warner Business Books, March 2003
 Your Road Map for Success, Thomas Nelson, March 2002 (Orig. titled: The Success Journey, Thomas Nelson, 1997)
 The 17 Indisputable Laws of Teamwork, Thomas Nelson, August 2001
 Failing Forward: Turning Your Mistakes into Stepping Stones for Success, Thomas Nelson, 2000
 The 21 Irrefutable Laws of Leadership, Thomas Nelson, 1998
 Developing the Leaders Around You, Thomas Nelson, 1995 (Repackaged 2003)
 Developing the Leader Within You, Thomas Nelson, 1993 (Repackaged 2001)
 Be a People Person, Cook Communications (Originally Chariot-Victor Books, 1989)
 Be All You Can Be, Cook Communications (Originally Chariot-Victor Books, 1987)
 Make Today Count, Center Street, First Center Street Edition: June 2008
 How Successful People Think (originally published as Thinking for a Change), Center Street, First Center Street Edition: June 2009
Intentional Living: Choosing a Life That Matters, Center Street, 2015
Developing the Leader Within You 2.0, HarperCollins, 2018

Notes

External links
 JohnMaxwell.com
 Christ Fellowship
 

American Christian clergy
American business writers
American motivational speakers
American motivational writers
American self-help writers
Christian writers
Azusa Pacific University alumni
Promise Keepers
Wesleyan Methodists
1947 births
Living people
Fuller Theological Seminary alumni
20th-century Methodists